Merethe Gudmundseth Storødegård (born 11 August 1961) is a Norwegian politician for the Labour Party.

From 1 January 2004 she was the director of the Trøndelag chapter of the Confederation of Norwegian Enterprise, succeeding Otto Gregussen. Between 1997 and 2003 she was the county mayor of Nord-Trøndelag County Municipality. She was first elected to Stjørdal municipal council at the age of eighteen, and in 2003 she ran for mayor, but was not elected.

She is a daughter of Roger Gudmundseth. She lives in Stjørdal.

References

1961 births
Living people
Labour Party (Norway) politicians
Politicians from Nord-Trøndelag
People from Stjørdal